Dr. Abdul Razak al-Hashimi is a former Iraqi diplomat, Minister of Higher Education, and senior advisor to Saddam Hussein.

Dr. Hashimi graduated from Boston University in 1969.  In 1974, he was part of a delegation to France to negotiate the purchase of nuclear reactors.

He led Iraq's Organisation of Friendship, Peace, and Solidarity to counter the 2003 Invasion of Iraq with human shield volunteers.

References

Year of birth missing (living people)
Living people
Boston University alumni
Iraqi diplomats
Government ministers of Iraq
Arab Socialist Ba'ath Party – Iraq Region politicians